Butyrolactone may refer to:

 beta-Butyrolactone
 gamma-Butyrolactone (GBL)